A slow movement is a form in a multi-movement musical piece. Generally, the second movement of a piece will be written as a slow movement, although composers occasionally write other movements as a slow movement as well. The tempo of a slow movement can vary from largo to andante. It is usually in the dominant, subdominant, parallel, or relative key of the musical work's main key.

Overview 
The general layout of a four-movement piece is as follows:

However, composers sometimes remove, add or re-arrange movements, such as Beethoven's Moonlight Sonata, which begins with the slow movement. When a piece has additional movements, they may also be written as a slow movement.

Form 
A slow movement is usually written in one of three forms: compound or "large" ternary, sonata form without development, and theme and variations.

Large ternary 
Large ternary is the most common form used for a slow movement. It consists of three parts, labeled ABA. The first and third part are almost identical, whereas the middle part is contrasting.
If the starting key is a major key, the middle part is typically written in a minor key; if the starting key is a minor key, the middle part is typically written in a major key. The keys do not have to have the same tonic. If the middle part is written in a major key, it is often labeled Maggiore. If it is written in a minor key, then it is labeled Minore.
The final part is always a return of the first part, but frequently has additional ornaments and small phrases added on.

Sonata form without development 
Sonata form without development is a variant of sonata form where the development is omitted, leaving only the exposition and recapitulation.  This form is also known as Sonatina form.  As written above, in Sonatina form, there is no development section, but rather a dominant-seventh chord between the exposition and the recapitulation that prepares for the recapitulation and the tonic key.  One example of the piece in sonata form without development is the second movement of Beethoven's Piano Sonata No. 17, "The Tempest".

Theme and variations 
Theme and variations form starts with a theme, followed by multiple variations. This theme is usually eight to thirty-two bars in length, and may be constructed as a musical sentence,  period, or small ternary. Each variation is a recurrence of the theme with melodic, harmonic, rhythmic and ornamental changes.

Theme and variations sometimes contain one "minore" variation. This variation will have a contrasting tonality, and may be different in form from the theme.

Theme and variations may also have a coda to finalize the piece. It may bring back the original theme with few or no changes, in order to create symmetry.

References
Caplin, W. E. (1998). Slow Movement Forms. Classical form: A Theory of Formal Functions for the Instrumental Music of Haydn, Mozart, and Beethoven. New York: Oxford University Press. 
Jacobson, Bernard. "Sonata." Encyclopædia Britannica Online. Encyclopædia Britannica, 13 Sept. 2012. Web. 15 Sept. 2016.

See also
Sonata

Music theory
Musical form